Coronado High School is the second newest high school in the Lubbock Independent School District. Coronado, named for the Spanish conquistador and explorer Francisco Vásquez de Coronado, opened its doors in 1965 as the fourth high school in Lubbock, joining the list of Lubbock High, Monterey High and Dunbar High.  Estacado was built two years after Coronado opened, in 1967.  The mascot of the school is the Mustang and the school colors are Scarlet and Old Gold. Like the other high schools in Lubbock ISD, Coronado discontinued its block scheduling in the 2012–13 academic calendar. and went to an every class everyday schedule. The school serves the southwestern part of Lubbock, Texas.  The Coronado male sports teams are known as the "Mustangs" with the female teams referred to as the "Lady Mustangs".

Notable alumni

Justin Duchscherer, MLB relief pitcher with the Oakland Athletics 
Sonny Dykes, head football coach of Texas Christian University
Landon Johnson, NFL linebacker with the Carolina Panthers 
Mark Lanier, attorney and trial lawyer 
Matt Martin, baseball coach with the Detroit Tigers
Willie McCool, one of the astronauts killed when the Columbia disintegrated over Texas 
Richie McDonald, lead singer of the band Lonestar 
Pete Orta, Christian rock guitarist and former member of the band Petra 
Scott Pelley, former anchor of the CBS Evening News 
Josh Rosenthal (singer/songwriter), singer/songwriter - 2001 graduate 
Mike Smith, coach for the Green Bay Packers
Josh Wilson (musician), Contemporary Christian artist/singer/songwriter - 2002 graduate 
Erika Valek, college basketball award winner
Trey Culver, two-time NCAA high jump champion
Jarrett Culver, NBA basketball player

References

Educational institutions established in 1965
Lubbock Independent School District
High schools in Lubbock, Texas
Public high schools in Texas
1965 establishments in Texas

es:Coronado High School